Massimo Pezzali (born 14 November 1967 in Pavia), commonly known as Max Pezzali, is an Italian singer-songwriter.

He was the principal singer and songwriter of the pop rock group 883. In 2004, he released his first solo album Il Mondo Insieme a Te. The album was successful in Italy, and since then Pezzali has remained a solo artist. Taking into account his solo work, as well as his work dating back to 883, Pezzali has sold over 10 million albums, thereby becoming one of the most popular singers in the history of Italian music.

Biography

Early life 
Max Pezzali was born on 14 November 1967 in Pavia, Italy. His parents owned a florist shop near the family home.

During his high school years, Pezzali was held back for one year because he did not achieve the required passing grades. It was in this class that he met his friend and future bandmate, Mauro Repetto. Pezzali and Repetto both shared a love for rock and roll music and it was this commonality that led them to the idea of starting a band. Together they went on holiday to the United States. During their stay they purchased a cheap synthesizer, a drumkit and some CDs, and upon their return to Pavia, immediately began writing music.

883 
Being big fans of motorbikes, especially Harley-Davidsons, Repetto and Pezzali decided to name the group '883' after the mark's Sportster. Pezzali and Repetto started their murisc career at the Castrocaro Music Festival in 1991, with the song "Non Me La Menare", which became a smash hit in Italy. Their first album, Hanno Ucciso L'Uomo Ragno ("Someone Killed Spider-Man"), hit number 1 on the Italian charts, in 1992. Their second album, Nord sud ovest est, produced the number 1 singles "Sei un mito" and "Come mai". In 1993, Pezzali and Rosario Fiorello won the 'Festival Italiano' with the song "Come Mai".

In 1994, Repetto left the band on good terms to pursue his dream of becoming a movie director in America. Pezzali recruited new members and continued the group. The departure of Repetto did not stop the group's productivity: they continued to perform, and in 1995 they released the album La Donna, Il Sogno E Il Grande Incubo which sold over 1.2 million copies. In 1997, 883 released La Dura Legge del Gol, followed by the collection Gli Anni in 1998, Grazie Mille in 1999, Mille Grazie in 2000 (released exclusively in Austria, Switzerland and Germany) and Uno in Più in 2001. 883 continued without Pezzali in 2002, when he announced his plans to begin a solo career and to take full credit for his songs. Over the course of their musical career (1992–2002), 883 released six studio albums, released over 25 music videos, and frequently toured throughout Italy.

Solo career 
In 2003, Pezzali began work on his first solo album, Il Mondo Insieme a Te, which was released in 2004. His style of writing differed very little from his music with 883. The main themes of his songs were still friendship, honesty, and relationships. In 2005, a greatest hits album was released, credited '883/Max Pezzali' and which included a DVD with all of the music videos made to date; it stayed at the top of the album chart for 10 weeks. His second solo album, Time Out, was released in 2007. It proved to be a great success, with its most popular songs remaining at the top of the charts throughout the summer. Pezzali is beloved by his fans for his friendly approach, charismatic stage performance, and his commitment to his music. In 2008, he came out with the new album Max Live 2008, which contained the greatest hits of his live performances and also included two unpublished songs ("Mezzo Pieno o Mezzo Vuoto" and "Ritornerò"). In the summer of 2008, the 'Max Live Tour' began in June and took in more than 25 Italian cities. The first concert took place in Monza; Pezzali followed with more 24 concerts and ended with his last stage performance on 31 December at 'Castelsardo'. Following this tour, he decided to take a break, when he decided to place his musical life in the background to dedicate himself to his newborn son. During these three years of semi-time off, he found time to collaborate with other singers and even participated in some reality shows (for example, participating as a guest star on X-Factor Italia in 2009). In 2010, he decided to take a year long sabbatical to write his next album, which was released the following year.

In 2011, Pezzali released the new album Terraferma, while 2012 saw the release of a collection of his songs sung with the most famous rap of Italy, included on the album Hanno Ucciso L'Uomo Ragno 2012. In 2013, he released his album Max 20, which contains 14 old hits by 883 and from his solo years, in duet with various Italian music artists, along with five songs that were previously unpublished; in 2015, Astronave Max was released. 2017 saw the launch of his new single "Le Canzoni alla Radio", featuring Nile Rodgers.<ref>[https://www.youtube.com/watch?v=wKaETA7geeIMax Pezzali – Le canzoni alla Radio (Official Video)]</ref> That same year, Pezzali released his album, also entitled Le Canzoni alla Radio and which contained old hits by 883 and Pezzali on his own, plus seven other previously unpublished songs. In 2018, Pezzali began his tour with Nek and Francesco Renga and released Max Nek Renga, Il Disco, which contains live performances of Pezzali, Nek and Renga.

 Personal life 
Pezzali is currently living in Rome, where he used to live with Martina Marinucci, his ex-wife. Max and Martina were married on 2 April 2005. After 13 years together, they officially separated in 2014. They have a son, Hilo, born in 2008. A few months after his separation, he became engaged to Debora Pelamatti. Pezzali is a big fan of motorbikes, especially of Harley-Davidson models (his group was named after the 883cc Harley-Davidson Sportster), and since 2000, he has been a partner of an authorized Harley-Davidson dealership in Pavia. He is a great fan of comics and his favorites are the superhero comics published by Marvel and the Italian comic book series Rat-Man created by Leo Ortolani. In fact, he has a collection of over 1300 comics. He is also a great fan of Bruce Springsteen, who represented an important source of inspiration for his music career. Pezzali is also a supporter of Inter Milan and has even dedicated a song to his football team, entitled "Sei Fantastica".

 Discography 
 883 
Studio albums
1992 – Hanno Ucciso L'Uomo Ragno1993 – Nord Sud Ovest Est1995 – La Donna, Il Sogno E Il Grande Incubo1997 – La Dura Legge del Gol!1999 – Grazie Mille2001 – Uno in PiùCompilations
1994 – Remix '941998 – Gli Anni2000 – Mille Grazie (only released in Austria, Switzerland and Germany)
2002 – Love/Life: L'Amore e La Vita al Tempo degli 8832013 – Collection: 883 Solo 
Studio albums
2004 – Il Mondo Insieme a Te2007 – Time Out2011 – Terraferma2015 – Astronave Max2020 – Qualcosa di nuovoCompilations
2005 – Tutto Max, FIMI: Gold
2012 – Hanno Ucciso L'Uomo Ragno 20122013 – Max 202017 – Le Canzoni alla radioLive albums
2008 – Max Live 20082018 – Max Nek Renga, Il Disco (feat. Nek and Francesco Renga)

 Other works 
In 1998, Pezzali dedicated much of his time to writing a book, which explained in detail the inspiration and details of his lyrics. It was titled Stessa Storia, Stesso Posto, Stesso Bar. During the same year, he starred in the movie Jolly Blue along with his old band-mates; the film featured many of 883's biggest hits, while the story-line was centered around the lyrics of selected songs from the band's repertoire.
In 2002, he was chosen to write the lyrics and record the vocals for the theme-tune of the Italian version of the movie Treasure Planet.
On 8 April 2008, he released his first novel, Per Prendersi una Vita.
In 2013, he released an autobiographical novel, I Cowboy Non-Mollano Mai – La Mia Storia.
He dubbed the Italian take on Jack Taggert in the movie Iron Man 3''.

Awards and nominations

References

External links

Musicians from Pavia
Italian pop singers
1967 births
Living people
Italian male singers
Italian songwriters
Male songwriters